Danielle Nicole Schulmann (born 22 December 1989) is an American-born Israeli professional footballer who plays as a forward for the Israel women's national team.

Early life
Schulmann grew up in Saddle River, New Jersey and attended Northern Highlands Regional High School.

Personal life
Schulmann's father is Daniel "Tiger" Schulmann, a Kyokushin karateka from New York City. Like her father, she is Jewish, which allowed her to make aliyah and to be a full-fledged Israeli citizen. As a result of her dual nationality, she was called up to the Israel women's national team.

Career
Schulmann was on the opening day roster for Sky Blue FC in April 2016.

References

External links
Maryland Terrapins profile
Connecticut Huskies profile

1989 births
Living people
Citizens of Israel through Law of Return
Israeli women's footballers
Women's association football forwards
F.C. Kiryat Gat (women) players
Maccabi Kishronot Hadera F.C. players
ASA Tel Aviv University players
Ligat Nashim players
Israel women's international footballers
Israeli Ashkenazi Jews
Jewish Israeli sportspeople
Israeli people of American-Jewish descent
People from Saddle River, New Jersey
Soccer players from New Jersey
American women's soccer players
Maryland Terrapins women's soccer players
Seton Hall Pirates women's soccer players
UConn Huskies women's soccer players
NJ/NY Gotham FC players
National Women's Soccer League players
Jewish American sportspeople
American emigrants to Israel
21st-century American Jews
21st-century American women